is a Japanese bobsledder who has competed since 1992. Competing in four Winter Olympics, he earned his best finish of 18th in both the two-man and four-man events at Lillehammer in 1994. Suzuki was eligible to compete for the 2006 Winter Olympics for Japan, but lost out to fellow bobsledder Suguru Kiyokawa.

Suzuki's best finish at the FIBT World Championships was 19th in the four-man event at Lake Placid, New York in 2009. His best World Cup finish was 21st on three occasions (twice in 2005, once in 2010).

References
 
 
 Bobsleighsport.com profile

1973 births
Bobsledders at the 1994 Winter Olympics
Bobsledders at the 1998 Winter Olympics
Bobsledders at the 2002 Winter Olympics
Bobsledders at the 2010 Winter Olympics
Bobsledders at the 2014 Winter Olympics
Japanese male bobsledders
Living people
Olympic bobsledders of Japan